Trichodes suturalis is a beetle species of checkered beetles belonging to the family Cleridae, subfamily Clerinae. It was described by Georg Karl Maria Seidlitz in 1891 and is endemic to Spain.

References

suturalis
Beetles described in 1891
Endemic fauna of Spain